Austin's official motto is the "Live Music Capital of the World" due to the high volume of live music venues in the city. Austin is known internationally for the South by Southwest (SXSW) and the Austin City Limits (ACL) Music Festivals which feature eclectic international line-ups. The greatest concentrations of music venues in Austin are around 6th Street, the Warehouse District, Downtown, Central East Austin, South Congress, the Red River District, the University of Texas, South Lamar, and South Austin.

"Austin music" in its modern form emerged in 1972 when "a new form of country music exploded on the scene that turned its back on Nashville and embraced the counterculture", much of it centered around the Armadillo World Headquarters music venue, which opened in 1970, alternating country and rock music shows. In 1972, Willie Nelson left Nashville and moved to Austin.

Austin became renowned as a haven for young innovative musicians who were drawn in by the creativity, liberal politics, and low cost-of-living. Austin's reputation continued to grow and become celebrated for its folk, blues, jazz, bluegrass, tejano, zydeco, new wave, punk, and indie music scenes.

The City also supports two orchestras: the Austin Symphony and Austin Civic Orchestras, as well as the Austin Opera and the Austin Baroque Orchestra and La Follia Austin Baroque.

History 
A large portion of Austin's early musical heritage began in the German Beer Gardens and Halls in the late 1800s, in places such as Scholz's Garden and Hall (the hall later to become Saengerrunde Hall) and further up the road at Dessau Hall. Dessau Hall peaked in the 1940s and 1950s with acts as diverse as Glenn Miller, Hank Williams, and Elvis Presley. 

Other major venues for country music included Big Gil's on South Congress and The Skyline on North Lamar. Local singer/yodeler Kenneth Threadgill opened Threadgill's in 1933 on North Lamar, a venue that later hosted Folk/Country jams  where Janis Joplin participated in her early days. On the East Side of town, which historically had a rich culture of African American heritage and influence, other music venues such as the Victory Grill, Charlie's Playhouse, Big Mary's, Ernie's Chicken Shack, and Doris Miller Auditorium featured local and touring acts. These destinations, which were part of the "chitlin circuit" featuring big bands, jazz and blues, became famous for later hosting musical legends including Duke Ellington, Ray Charles, Bobby Bland, B.B. King, Ike Turner and Tina Turner.

In 1964 the Broken Spoke opened, featuring country acts such as Bob Wills, Ernest Tubb, and the young Willie Nelson. The late-1960s and 1970s saw the country music popularized by Willie Nelson and others being joined by a host of other music brought by the more liberal inhabitants, who migrated to Austin during these two decades. Specifically, Roky Erickson and his 13th Floor Elevators helped bring in this psychedelic era.

In the 1960s in Austin, Texas, legendary music venues included the Vulcan Gas Company and the Armadillo World Headquarters-and musical talent like Janis Joplin, the 13th Floor Elevators, and, later, Stevie Ray Vaughan. Austin was also home to a large New Left activist movement, one of the earliest underground papers, The Rag, and graphic artists like creator Gilbert Shelton, underground comix pioneer Jack Jackson (Jaxon), and surrealist armadillo artist Jim Franklin.
Austin was home to the Vulcan Gas Company that featured headliners such as the 13th Floor Elevators, (Johnny and Edgar) Winter brothers, and Shiva's Headband. 

The Vulcan morphed into the Armadillo World Headquarters in 1970 and for more than ten years featured music of all genres, from Bruce Springsteen to Bette Midler, as well as local ballet, blues and jazz. The artwork from this establishment was a part of the Austin scene and the Armadillo became the Austin city animal. Songs such as Gary P. Nunn's "London Homesick Blues" (which includes in the chorus "I want to go home with the armadillo") made this a staple of Austin. The artist who began the Armadillo logo was Jim Franklin, who is still working today.

"Austin music" in its modern form emerged in 1972 when "a new form of country music exploded on the scene that turned its back on Nashville and embraced the counterculture". Eddie Wilson had opened the Armadillo World Headquarters music venue in 1970, alternating country and rock music shows, but in 1972, Willie Nelson left Nashville and moved to Austin, following others including Michael Martin Murphey, Marcia Ball, Steve Earle, Gary P. Nunn, Jerry Jeff Walker, Ray Wylie Hubbard, and Waylon Jennings. 

Willie Nelson's audiences at the Armadillo included both hippies and rednecks. On New Year's Eve, Austin's local KOKE.FM radio station switched to a new format geared to the mixed crowds first called "country rock", and later "progressive country".

By November of that year, the first pilot for the iconic Austin City Limits was being filmed with Willie....Billboard Magazine named KOKE “the most innovative radio station in the country;" and Austin had a national reputation thanks largely to the reporting of Rolling Stone stringer Chet Flippo, who seemed to get a dispatch from the Armadillo into every issue."

In the following years, Austin gained a reputation as a place where struggling musicians could launch their careers in front of receptive audiences, at informal live venues. A major influence during this time was Clifford Antone and the namesake blues club he founded in 1975, at the age of 25. Antone's located on Austin's 6th Street fostered the careers of a number of musicians, including Stevie Ray Vaughan. 

Liberty Lunch was a live-music venue in Austin and during its heyday in the late 1970s and 1980s featured all kinds of music, including reggae and ska, punk, indie, country and rock. The venue was forced to close to make way for Austin's downtown redevelopment in the late 1990s. Since then, Liberty Lunch has attained a legendary status in the history of Austin music. Now-defunct Armadillo World Headquarters has attained a similar status.

Austin's live music scene has experienced a resurgence in the past few years after losing some of its best loved venues (Liberty Lunch, Armadillo and others), a host of new clubs have risen up to continue Austin's rich live music heritage. However, The Hole in the Wall, open since 1974 and a live music staple that lent a corner and then finally a stage to  Doug Sahm and Blaze Foley, is still operating. Places such as the Skylark Lounge, Stubb's, Ginny's Little Longhorn, and a list of others have also become a stalwart of a new generation of live music venues throughout the city.

The punk/new wave era in Austin began in earnest in 1978. The Club Foot played an important role in hosting many of the local punk/new wave acts. The city's first two rock/new wave bands, the Skunks and the Violators, made their debut at a University-area club called Raul's in February. 

The explosive show by the Sex Pistols in San Antonio the previous month helped build toward an excited reception for local purveyors of the style. The Skunks' lineup consisted of Jesse Sublett on bass and vocals, Eddie Munoz on guitar and Bill Blackmon on drums. The Violators featured Kathy Valentine (later of The Go-Go's), Carla Olson (later of the Textones), Marilyn Dean and Sublett on bass. The Violators were short-lived, as all the members except for Sublett moved to LA the following year. Margaret Moser, of the Austin Chronicle, later wrote that "The Skunks put Austin on the rock n' roll map."  Another influential band that led the punk scene in Austin was the Big Boys.

Austin became one of the important stops on every tour of important punk/new wave acts. Many of these bands, such as the Police, Joe Jackson, Blondie and Talking Heads, played at the Armadillo. A number of them, including the Clash, Elvis Costello and Blondie, would make appearances at gigs by the Skunks and take the opportunity to jam with the band.

The 1980s and 1990s also helped shape Austin's music scene. Waterloo Records, which has been voted the best independent record store in the country and hosts live in-store shows, first opened in 1982. Austinite Stevie Ray Vaughan won a Grammy in 1990 for best contemporary blues album. After tragically dying in a helicopter crash, he was memorialized with a statue on the shores of Austin's Lady Bird Lake. Additionally in 1991, Austin city leaders named Austin, "The Live Music Capital of the World", because of the number of live music venues.

Visitors and Austinites alike may notice the 10-foot guitars standing on the sides of the city's streets. In 2006, Gibson Guitar brought Guitar Town to Austin, placing 35 of these giant guitars around the city.

The Austin Music Foundation is one of several Austin groups that help independent artists further their music careers. Assisting musicians with medical needs are the SIMS Foundation and Health Alliance for Austin Musicians (HAAM). Promotion, preservation and education is the mission of the Austin Blues Society, formed in 2006 by Kaz Kazanoff and other blues community notables. 

Helping to promote the $1 billion music industry in the city is the Austin Music Office. A department of the Austin Convention & Visitors Bureau, the Austin Music Office offers creative, personalized assistance in booking live music, discounted Austin Compilation CDs and mini-guides to the city's live music scene, assistance with utilization of live music venues for off-site events, and guidance with local music attractions and creation of music tours.

Television 
The PBS live music television show Austin City Limits began in 1974  and has featured, over 500 artists of various genres, including rock, folk, country, bluegrass and zydeco. Partly responsible for Austin's reputation as a live music hub, the show is broadcast worldwide and stands as the longest running music television program ever. On February 26, 2011, ACL held its first taping in its new purpose-built Moody Theater and studio in downtown Austin's W Austin Hotel and Residences. Despite a seating capacity of over 2,700, audiences will be limited to around 800 (the original total seating capacity of the old studio). The additional seating capacity will be used for the ACL Live concert series at the venue.

Austin was also home to the Austin Music Network (AMN), which broadcast from 1994 to 2005. AMN, featured on cable channel 15, proclaimed itself to be the only non-profit independent music television channel, and its programming was mostly music videos or recorded live sessions, interspersed with presenters. Although all musical tastes were broadcast, AMN emphasized non-mainstream music such as indie, punk, blues, country and jazz.

Channel 15 was a 24-hour music channel now run by Music and Entertainment Television (M*E). M*E launched October 1, 2005 and was broadcast to Austin and the 44 surrounding cities. M*E was a regional network dedicated to showcasing and providing television exposure for regional artists as well as the hundreds of touring groups that make up the vibrant Texas live music scene. Supporting established artists and promoting and discovering new talent is a priority. M*E represented different musical genres and areas of the arts community with numerous original programs highlighting everything from filmmakers to art galleries, and musicians to the ballet. In addition, M*E's mostly music line-up, spotlighted live performance footage, concept music videos as well as biographies, reviews, restaurant tours and more.

Festivals 

Austin is the home of South by Southwest (SXSW), an annual film, music and interactive conference and festival, and the expanding number of fringe events that take place during the festival, at venues all over town. In the fall, Austin hosts the Austin City Limits Music Festival (ACL) and the Fun Fun Fun Fest. 

In the spring, the long-running Old Settler's Music Festival takes place at the Salt Lick Pavilion & Camp Ben McCulloch just outside the city. Every summer, Austin City Limits Radio puts on a series of free blues shows in Zilker Park entitled "Blues on the Green. " 

Also in the summer, the City of Austin Parks and Recreation Department holds the Hillside Summer Concert Series music festival, throughout the month of July. This is held at the Pan American Recreation Center. This festival features popular local and national Tejano and Latin music performers. Jason Rubio, of Austin's Best DJs, was the first DJ to perform at the festival, in 2014. 

Numerous other music festivals occur year-round. Other annual festivals include the "Keep Austin Weird Festival " and the Heart of Texas Quadruple Bypass Music Festival a.k.a. The Texas Rockfest.

Austin is home to other large annual festivals including:

 Carnaval Brasileiro
 Eeyore's Birthday Party
 Levitation  (formerly Austin Psych Fest)
 Old Pecan Street Festival
 Republic of Texas Biker Rally
 Urban Music Festival

Venues
The Austin Chronicle, Visit Austin, Do512, and Phosphene Productions offer information on the most common venues that host local bands.

Below is a short list of notable venues:

 Antone's (reopened in new location)
 B. D. Riley's (new location)
 The Backyard
 Beerland
 The Broken Spoke
 C-Boy's Heart & Soul
 Cactus Cafe (UT campus)
 The Carousel Lounge
 Cedar Street Courtyard
 Central Market
 Central Presbyterian Church
 Cheer Up Charlies
 Come and Take It Live
 The Continental Club
 Dirty Dog Bar (formerly The Metro)
 Donn's Depot
 Ego's
 Elephant Room
 Elysium Night Club
 Emo's
 Empire Control Room and Garage
 Evangeline Café
 Flamingo Cantina
 Friends
 Geraldine's
 Green Mesquite
 Guero's
 The Highball
 Hole in the Wall
 Hotel Vegas/The Volstead
 Icenhauer's
 The Little Longhorn Saloon
 Maggie Mae's
 The Mohawk (formerly The Caucus Club)
 Moody Center
 ACL Live at the Moody Theater
 Nutty Brown Café
 One-2-One Bar
 One World Theater
 The Parish
 The Parlor
 Poodies
 Red 7 (now Barracuda)
 The Sahara Lounge
 Saxon Pub
 Scoot Inn
 Skylark Lounge
 Shooters
 Speakeasy
 Spider House Cafe
 Stubb's BBQ
 Swan Dive
 Tellers
 The White Horse

In addition to the usual restaurant/bar venues listed above, Austin offers live music in unexpected places as well. These unique venues include:
 City Hall - Every Thursday, City Council honors a local musician at its council meeting. Also, the free concert series "Live from the Plaza" takes place at City Hall every Friday at noon from April to December.
 Austin-Bergstrom International Airport - Live music is featured 11 times a week at four locations.
 Grocery Stores - Central Market features live music three times a week, while Whole Foods Market hosts the "Music at the Market" music series every Thursday evening in the spring.
 Road Races - The Austin Marathon hosts more than 30 bands along the race course and the Capitol 10K features a band at every mile marker.
 House Concerts - Hosting a variety of genres, Austin locals often open their doors to both local and touring musicians, with audiences ranging from a few friends to up to 200.

Musical acts 

Austin musicians:

 The Alice Rose
 Alpha Rev
 Alan Haynes
 The American Analog Set
 …And You Will Know Us by the Trail of Dead
 Arc Angels
 ArcAttack
 Asleep at the Wheel
 Asylum Street Spankers
 Austin Lounge Lizards
 Averse Sefira
 Balcones Fault
 Marcia Ball
 Balmorhea
 Band of Heathens
 Carpetbagger
 Lou Ann Barton
 Best Fwends
  Beto y los Fairlanes
 Big Boys
 The Black and White Years
 The Black Angels
 Black Heart Saints
 Black Joe Lewis and the Honeybears
 Black Pistol Fire
 Black Pumas
 The Boxing Lesson
 Blue Cartoon
 Blue October
 The Bright Light Social Hour
 Brobdingnagian Bards
 Doyle Bramhall II
 Butthole Surfers
 Ray Campi
 Cindy Cashdollar
 Chaski (Latin American folk music ensemble)
 Chingon
 Courtyard hounds
 Gina Chavez
 Gary Clark, Jr.
 Lakrea Clark
 W. C. Clark
 Slaid Cleaves
 Shawn Colvin
 Court Yard Hounds
 Kacy Crowley
 Dax Riggs
 Dangerous Toys
 Jesse Dayton
 Death is not a joyride
 Del Castillo
 The Derailers
 Dexter Freebish
 The Dicks
 The Dixie Chicks
 The Eastern Sea
 Electric Touch
 Joe Ely
 Alejandro Escovedo
 Esther's Follies
 Explosions in the Sky
 Dickins
 The Fabulous Thunderbirds
 David Persons
 Fastball
 Feathers
 Rosie Flores
 Michael Fracasso
 Max Frost
 Full Service
 Future Clouds and Radar
 Davíd Garza
 Larry Gatlin
 Ghostland Observatory
 Eliza Gilkyson
 Jimmie Dale Gilmore
 Golden Arm Trio
 Johnny Goudie
 The Gourds
 Slim Richey's Jitterbug Vipers
 Jon Dee Graham
 Kydd Jones
 Patty Griffin
 The Pictures
 Grupo Fantasma
 Harlem
 Roy Heinrich
 Tje Austin
 Terri Hendrix
 Sara Hickman
 Tish Hinojosa
 The Hot Club of Cowtown
 I Love You But I've Chosen Darkness
 Jack Ingram
 Eric Johnson
 River Jones
 Kaleo
 Robert Earl Keen
 Ben Kweller
 Jimmy LaFave
 The Lovely Sparrows
 Lower Class Brats
 The Lucky Strikes
 Lloyd Maines
 Julian Mandrake
 Matt the Electrician
 Carson McHone
 James McMurtry
 MDC
 Missio
 Mingo Fishtrap
 Monte Montgomery
 Mother Falcon
 Abra Moore
 Ian Moore
 Gurf Morlix
 Mothfight
 Trish Murphy
 Willie Nelson
 The Nightowls
 The Noise Revival Orchestra
 Matt Noveskey
 The Octopus Project
 The Offenders
 Okkervil River
 One-Eyed Doll
 Paul Oscher
 Ephraim Owens
 Patrice Pike
 Toni Price
 Pushmonkey
 Quiet Company
 Reckless Kelly
 Recover
 Redd Volkaert
 Luke Redfield
 The Reivers
 Riddlin' Kids
 Ringo Deathstarr
 Riverboat Gamblers
 The Rocketboys
 Carrie Rodriguez
 Bruce Robison
 Calvin Russell
 Bob Schneider
 Charlie Sexton
 Shakey Graves
 Shearwater
 Shinyribs
 Soul Track Mind
 Soulhat
 Spoon
 Stars of the Lid
 Storyville
 Sunny Sweeney
 The Sword
 Owen Temple
 Rick Trevino
 Kathy Valentine
 Vallejo
 Jimmie Vaughan
 Patricia Vonne
 Voxtrot
 Jerry Jeff Walker
 Tank Washington
 Watchtower
 Dale Watson
 What Made Milwaukee Famous
 White Denim
 White Ghost Shivers
 Bobby Whitlock
 Kelly Willis
 The Wind and The Wave
 Wiretree
 Carolyn Wonderland
 The Yuppie Pricks

Musicians who previously contributed to the Austin music scene (including those who died, have broken up, or moved from the city):

 13th Floor Elevators
 Angela Strehli
 Bad Livers
 Dynamite Hack
 Experimental Aircraft
 Gal's Panic
 Glass Eye
 Kellye Gray
 Greezy Wheels
 Nanci Griffith
 Marc Gunn
 The Impossibles
 Daniel Johnston
 Poi Dog Pondering
 Charlie Robison
 Scratch Acid
 Sound Team
 Shoulders
 The Sword
 Timbuk3
 Twang Twang Shock-A-Boom
 Two Nice Girls
 Uncle Walt's Band
 Union Jack and the Megatones
 Ünloco
 Volcano, I'm Still Excited!!
 Wideawake
 Lucinda Williams
 3D Friends

Deceased Austin musicians include:

 Stephen Bruton
 Janis Joplin
 Doug Sahm
 Randy Turner AKA Biscuit
 Stevie Ray Vaughan
 Calvin Russell
 Don Walser
 Gene Ramey
 Pee Wee Crayton
 Teddy Wilson
 Robert Shaw
 Keith Ferguson
 Bill Neely
 Grey Ghost
 Blaze Foley
 Townes Van Zandt
 Doyle Bramhall
 Bobby Doyle 
 Walter Hyatt
 Rusty Wier 
 Ian McLagan
 Jesse Taylor
 Pinetop Perkins
 Gary Primich
 Nick Curran
 Jody Payne
 Tony Campise

The Austin Music Memorial at the Joe and Teresa Long Center honors those who have contributed to the development of the Austin music community.

See also 

 List of radio stations in Austin

Notes

Further reading

External links
 Austin Music Foundation
 Austin Music Office

 
Music scenes
Austin, Texas